Asia Muhammad was the defending champion, but chose not to participate.

Qualifier Kim Da-bin won the title, defeating Ann Li in the final, 6–1, 6–3.

Seeds

Draw

Finals

Top half

Bottom half

References

External Links
Main Draw

Kentucky Bank Tennis Championships - Singles
Lexington Challenger